Kazár is a village in Nógrád County, Hungary with 1,860 inhabitants (2014). 

Populated places in Nógrád County